American Wrestler: The Wizard is a 2016 American sports biographical film directed by Alex Ranarivelo. The film centers around the world of competitive high school wrestling and stars George Kosturos as Ali Jahani, a 17–year old who escapes Iran in the 1980s after the Iran hostage crisis and must adjust to life in a small California town only to face more hostility in America due to the hostage crisis. Wanting to fit in, Ali joins the school's wrestling team and becomes the squad's star member.  Ali faces a mountain of adversity everywhere he turns, but through determination and with a chance to change how others see him, Ali must step up and learn to be a hero against all odds. William Fichtner, Jon Voight, Ali Afshar, Gabriel Basso, Kevin G. Schmidt and Lia Marie Johnson also star in supporting roles.

Cast
 George Kosturos as Ali Jahani
 William Fichtner as Coach Plyler
 Ali Afshar as Hafez Tabad
 Lia Marie Johnson as Kristi Larsen
 Gabriel Basso as Jimmy Petersen
 Jon Voight as Principal Robert Skinner
 Sasha Feldman as Dan 'Toad' Webster
 Chase Mowen as Mike Thornhill
 Kevin G. Schmidt as Roman Knox
 Nicholas Guilak as Pasha
 Shannon Collis as Wendy

Production

Development
The idea for American Wrestler: The Wizard is heavily transpired by producer Ali Afshar who took up wrestling in his high school after fleeing from his home country of Iran due to the political outrage in the 1970s. Speaking on his take of biographical films, Ali stated that he wanted to show that any tough situation can have a positive impact no matter what the outcome. He wanted to emphasise the demeanour of how one's loss can actually be turned into a win.

Majority of the filming took place in Petaluma, California, with scenes being shot at Casa Grande High School (which was renamed to East Petaluma High School for the film), as well as Tomales high school for hallway scenes, cafeteria scenes, as well as the gymnasium being used for some wrestling scenes. Some scenes were also shot in Santa Rosa mainly in the Sonoma County area.

Music
Jamie Christopherson who previously worked on Metal Gear Rising: Revengeance and The Crow: Wicked Prayer composed the film's score. Christopherson used a blend of traditional orchestra and synths and worked with Iranian musicians. He also co-composed the film's theme song titled "Rise" with Armenian-Iranian singer, Andy featuring American singer Shani Rigsbee.

Release
The film premiered at the Newport Beach Film Festival on April 23, 2016 and had a limited theatrical run starting May 3, 2017.

Accolades

Sequel
The sequel titled American Wrestler: The Fighter was announced by producers Forrest Lucas and Ali Afshar. Principal photography began in North Carolina in June 2017. George Kosturos returns to star with Tommy Flanagan, Bryan Craig, Sean Patrick Flanery and Parviz Sayyad joining as new cast members.

References

External links
 
 
 
 
 

2016 films
2016 biographical drama films
American biographical drama films
Films set in the 1980s
Sport wrestling films
Asian-American drama films
2016 drama films
Iranian-American films
2010s English-language films
2010s American films